Allpress  is an English surname. Notable people with the surname include:

 Bruce Allpress (1930–2020), New Zealand actor
 Gordon Allpress (born 1949), New Zealand-born Australian darts player
 Lisa Allpress (born 1974/75), New Zealand jockey
 Tim Allpress (born 1971), English footballer

English-language surnames